The Faculty of Conflict and Catastrophe Medicine operates under the Society of Apothecaries though it is considered a separate organisation with its own registered charity status. It was established in 2005, shortly after the London bombings where on review it was felt that medical organisations would benefit from training in dealing with extreme situations i.e. Conflict and Catastrophe Medicine.

Education
The main focus of the Faculty is the provision of education through its year-long postgraduate diploma Conflict and Catastrophe course.

Student Elective
The faculty awards a student elective prize every year.

Events and Lectures
The Faculty of Conflict and Catastrophe hold two lectures each year which are open to the public; the Audrey Few Lecture and their Spring Lecture.

Previous Speakers at Lectures
The Faculty has previously hosted
Ari Leppaniemi on the topic of advancements in surgery
Kate Adie
Stephanie Simmonds – on the topic of humanitarian Aid as a donor, UN and NGO stakeholder' 
Dr Roel Coutinho on the topic of Infectious Diseases in a Global Setting 
Dr Emer McGilloway on the topic of History and Recent Advances in the Rehabilitation of Brain Injured Personnel

References

External links
 Society of Apothecaries
 Apothecaries' Rose Prize
 Apothecaries' Hall entrance

Medical associations based in the United Kingdom